Thomas Henry Davis may refer to:
 Thomas Henry Davis (businessman) (1918–1999), founder of the former Piedmont Airlines
 Thomas Henry Davis (organist) (1867–1947), English cathedral organist

See also 
 Thomas Davis (disambiguation)